Jesse Minter (born May 9, 1983) is an American football coach who is currently the defensive coordinator at Michigan.

Playing career 
Minter was a four-year wide receiver at Mount St. Joseph from 2002 to 2005.

Coaching career 
Minter began his coaching career at Notre Dame as a defensive intern for one season before going on to Cincinnati as a graduate assistant. He left Cincinnati after two seasons to become the linebackers coach at Indiana State in 2009, working his way up to defensive coordinator. 

Minter joined Georgia State in 2012 as their defensive coordinator. During his time with Georgia State, he helped develop the Panthers defense to where they were eighth in the Football Bowl Subdivision (FBS) pass defense in his final season with the team, while also earning a Broyles Award nomination. He departed Georgia State to join the Baltimore Ravens in 2017 as a defensive assistant, where he worked with the defensive backs. He was promoted to defensive backs coach in 2020.

Minter was hired at Vanderbilt in 2021 as their defensive coordinator and safeties coach.

Minter was announced to be joining the University of Michigan coaching staff as the Matthew and Nicole Lester Family Football Defensive Coordinator on February 9, 2022.

Personal life 
Minter's father Rick was the head coach at Cincinnati and is currently a defensive analyst at Michigan. Minter and his wife Rachelle have two children, Camilla and Montgomery.

References

External links
 
 Michigan profile
 Vanderbilt profile

1983 births
Living people
American football wide receivers
Baltimore Ravens coaches
Cincinnati Bearcats football coaches
Georgia State Panthers football coaches
Indiana State Sycamores football coaches
Michigan Wolverines football coaches
Mount St. Joseph Lions football players
Notre Dame Fighting Irish football coaches
Vanderbilt Commodores football coaches
Sportspeople from Little Rock, Arkansas
People from Yorktown, Indiana
Coaches of American football from Arkansas
Coaches of American football from Indiana
Players of American football from Arkansas
Players of American football from Indiana